The 1921 Paris–Tours was the 16th edition of the Paris–Tours cycle race and was held on 17 April 1921. The race started in Paris and finished in Tours. The race was won by Francis Pélissier.

General classification

References

1921 in French sport
1921
April 1921 sports events